The Lutheran Old Niendorf Cemetery is a church-operated historic burial ground in Hamburg, Germany. The cemetery is owned by the Evangelical Lutheran parish church of Niendorf, Hamburg.

History and description
The old cemetery was established in 1840 as a parish burial ground for the baroque church of Niendorf which was built in 1770. The cemetery has a size of approximately 4.5 hectares, on which there are 2,350 graves, where 6,500 people are buried. The cemetery is one of the most historically significant cemeteries in Hamburg. It contains a high number of large family tombs and mausoleums.

Selected notable burials

Hanseatic families
Notable people buried here include many members of the Hanseatic families of Hamburg, such as
 Several members of the Amsinck family, including
 Wilhelm Amsinck (1821–1909), businessman and politician
 Johannes Amsinck, merchant
 Ludwig Erdwin Amsinck, merchant
 Martin Garlieb Amsinck, ship-owner
 Several members of the Berenberg/Gossler family, including
 John von Berenberg-Gossler, banker and senator
 Baron Cornelius von Berenberg-Gossler, banker
 Baron Johann ("John") von Berenberg-Gossler, banker
 Several members of the Merck family, including
 Ernest William Merck, banker
 Erwin Johannes Merck, banker

Other burials
 Axel von Ambesser (1910–1988), German actor and film director
 Josef Posipal (1927–1997), Romanian-born German footballer
 Evelyn Hamann (1942–2007), German actress

Gallery

References and external links

  
 

Cemeteries in Hamburg
Lutheran cemeteries
Lutheran cemeteries in Germany
1840 establishments in Germany
Buildings and structures completed in 1840